Venus in Furs is a 1995 film by filmmakers and independent art-house Dutch film producers Maartje Seyferth and Victor Nieuwenhuijs and it was their first feature film. The film has been shot on black-and-white 35mm film.

Plot
The story in this film is a loose adaptation of the novel Venus in Furs by Leopold von Sacher-Masoch.

Cast
 Wanda: Anne van der Ven
 Severin: André Arend van Noord

Crew
 Directors: Maartje Seyferth & Victor Nieuwenhuijs
 Cinematography: Victor Nieuwenhuijs
 Lighting: Peter Gray
 Sound: Peter Burghout/Volfango Pecoraio
 Editing: Herbert van Drongelen/Maartje Seyferth

Releases
 Theatrical: the Netherlands, Germany, France
 International Sales: REEL SUSPECTS.
 Video DVD: the Netherlands, Germany, France, England, Japan

Prizes
 Int. Film Festival of St.Petersburg, Russia – Awarded for Creative Quest and True Professional Properties.

External links

1995 films
1995 directorial debut films
Dutch drama films
BDSM in films